The Brandt Report is the report written by the Independent Commission, first chaired by Willy Brandt, in 1980. The Independent Commission for International Developmental Issues was established in 1977 with the aim to review international development issues, with the former German Chancellor being nominated as Head by Robert McNamara, then the World Bank President. The result of this report provided an understanding of drastic differences in the economic development of the Global North and Global South.

Thesis
The Brandt Report suggests primarily that a great chasm in standard of living exists along the North-South divide and there should therefore be a large transfer of resources from developed to developing countries. The countries North of the divide are extremely wealthy due to their successful trade in manufactured goods, whereas the countries South of the divide suffer poverty due to their trade in intermediate goods, where the export incomes are low.

The Brandt Commission envisaged a new kind of global security. It built its arguments on a pluralist perspective that combines several social, economic and political perils together with classical military perils.

Twenty years later, in 2001, the Brandt Report was updated by James Quilligan, who was Information Director for the Brandt Commission between 1980 and 1987. His updated report was called "The Brandt Equation."

The Brandt Line

The Brandt Line is a visual depiction of the North-South divide between their economies, based on GDP per capita, proposed by Willy Brandt in the 1980s. It encircles the world at a latitude of 30° N, passing between North and Central America, north of Africa, the Middle East and most of East Asia, but lowered towards the south to include Japan, Australia, and New Zealand above the line.

Keynote quotation

References

External links

STWR - The Brandt Report
The Brandt Equation

Economic geography
History of international development
Economic inequality
Willy Brandt